Virginia Ruano Pascual and Paola Suárez were the defending champions and successfully defended their title, defeating Lisa Raymond and Rennae Stubbs 6–4, 6–2 in the final.

Seeds

Draw

Finals

Top half

Section 1

Section 2

Bottom half

Section 3

Section 4

External links
 Official Results Archive (WTA)
2002 French Open – Women's draws and results at the International Tennis Federation

Women's Doubles
French Open by year – Women's doubles
French Open - Women's Doubles
French Open – doubles
French Open – doubles